Kris Jenkins (born November 20, 1993) is an American former professional basketball player who is a student athlete development assistant at Villanova University. He played college basketball for the Villanova Wildcats and is best known for hitting the buzzer-beating three pointer to win the 2016 NCAA Championship game.

High school career
Jenkins attended Gonzaga College High School. As a junior in 2011–12, he averaged 20.6 points and 10.4 rebounds per game. As a senior, he had 18.3 points and 10.3 rebounds per game. The Washington Post named him the 2012–13 Boys Basketball All-Met Player of the Year.

College career

Jenkins played his entire college basketball career for the Villanova Wildcats. During his freshman season, the 2013–14 season, he averaged 4.1 points per game as a reserve player. The following season, he had 6.3 points per game.

As a junior, on March 1, 2016, Jenkins scored a career-high 31 points in a win over DePaul. He averaged 19.7 points per game in the Big East Tournament and was named to the All-Tournament team. In the NCAA championship game on April 4, 2016 against North Carolina, Jenkins hit the game-winning three-point shot as time expired. In his junior season, Jenkins averaged 13.6 points and 3.9 rebounds per game while shooting 45.9 percent of his field-goal attempts and 38.6 percent from beyond the arc.

Jenkins was an Honorable Mention All-Big East selection as a senior. In his senior season, he posted averages of 13.1 points and 4.1 rebounds per game. Jenkins shot 38.4 percent from the floor, 36.0 percent from behind the arc, and 86.2 percent from the foul line. In his Villanova career, Jenkins scored 1,383 points, 34th on the program's all-time list.

Professional career

Sioux Falls Skyforce (2017)
After going undrafted in the 2017 NBA draft, Jenkins joined the Washington Wizards for the 2017 NBA Summer League. Jenkins was picked by the Sioux Falls Skyforce with the 14th pick in the 2017 NBA G League Draft. On December 16, 2017, Jenkins was waived by the Skyforce.

Yakima SunKings (2018)
On January 16, 2018, Jenkins signed with the Yakima SunKings of the North American Premier Basketball League (NAPB).

Eisbären Bremerhaven (2018–2019)
Kris Jenkins signed with the German club Eisbären Bremerhaven on August 14, 2018.

Executive career 
In February 2020, Jenkins was hired by Villanova University, his alma mater, as an assistant in the student athlete development field.

Personal life
Kris Jenkins grew up living with Nate Britt. The two were opponents in the 2016 NCAA Men's Division I Basketball Championship Game, as Britt played for the Tar Heels. The following year, when the Tar Heels made a second consecutive appearance in the NCAA Tournament title game, Jenkins attended, supporting his adoptive brother's team, sitting right behind the Tar Heel bench and wearing a Carolina-branded T-shirt.

References

External links
Villanova Wildcats bio

1993 births
Living people
African-American basketball players
American expatriate basketball people in Germany
American men's basketball players
Basketball players from Columbia, South Carolina
Eisbären Bremerhaven players
Gonzaga College High School alumni
Sioux Falls Skyforce players
Small forwards
Villanova Wildcats men's basketball players
21st-century African-American sportspeople